Ateliers François SA roots go back in history, it came into being initially as ‘'Etablissements François” 
in 1870 in Sclessin-lez-Liège in Belgium.

This company manufactured pneumatic hammers for tunnelling. By 1896 it transformed into Moteurs S.A. to build 
high speed steam engines.

By the early 20th century, when Mr. Zenobe Gramme invented the electrical Dynamo, the steam engines were obsolete, and AF were manufacturing reciprocating compressors for the coal Industry.

Nearly 30 years later the company was reformed as Moteurs & François Réunis s.a. and over the next two decades this company continued to develop its heavy duty compressors especially for the Steel industry with powers up to 1000 HP.

After 1960, when Ateliers François s.a. was formed, a range of oil free reciprocating compressors with PTFE piston rings were developed and these successfully operated when high quality air was needed in the brewing, chemical, petro-chemical, pharmaceutical and food industries. In the reciprocating piston oil free compressor technology, the L design is typical to AF.

The early 1980s saw the first entry, into the world of bottling liquids, of PET material. To form bottles, which are blown into a mould, required much higher than normal pressure of air and AF Compressors were to realise that this was en emerging market of importance and designed a range of 40 bar oil free PET compressors to meet this need.

Since then it is now common to see, mineral water, carbonated soft drinks, fruits juices, edible oil, beers, vinegar, wines, dipping and sauces, liquid soaps, medicines, cosmetics and perfumes all in PET bottles and AF's production is almost totally now in High pressure oil free compressors for this application. Since 1990s AF has developed subsidiaries and technical support in the whole Europe, in Russia, in China, the Middle-East, Africa, Latin America, Northern America, Africa, in the Far East and also in the South East Asia and Pacific.

References

1995 September 14 - Magazine Entreprendre, Sergio Carrozzo
1995 October 9 - Druckluftteknik
1996 September - Pack News, Yves Meert

Manufacturing companies of Belgium
Manufacturing companies established in 1870
Privately held companies of Belgium
1870 establishments in Belgium
Companies based in Liège Province